The Directorate General of Customs and Excise ( abbreviated  or DJBC) is an Indonesian government agency under Ministry of Finance that serves the community in the field of customs and excise. The Directorate General of Customs and Excise has the duty to organize the formulation and implementation of policies in the field of supervision, law enforcement, service and optimization of state revenue in the field of customs and excise in accordance with the provisions of legislation. The directorate also carry out some basic tasks of the Ministry of Finance in the field of customs and excise, in accordance with policies established by the Minister and securing government policies relating to the traffic of goods entering or leaving the Customs Area and the collection of import duties and excise and other state levies based on legislation apply.

During the Dutch colonial era, a government institutions called the  Import and Export Customs and Excise Service was created for duty and excise tax collections in the territory of the Dutch East Indies. The present organization was created on 1 October 1946, at the midst of the Indonesian National Revolution. Originally, the agency was named the Customs and Excise Office, before changing into its present name.

The Directorate General of Customs and Excise is divided into several branches in different regions across Indonesia. The directorate reports directly to the Ministry of Finance.

History
The establishment of official customs and excise administration in Indonesia began during the colonialization period of the Netherlands, specifically upon the entry of VOC to the country.

This Bureau is headed by a Chief Inspector who doubles as an advisor to the Director of Finance for trade and shipping domiciled in Batavia. At that time the Customs Bureau was headed by a civilian officer appointed directly from the Netherlands. Several Heads of the Customs and Excise Office of the Netherlands Indies period are as follows: G.F. De Bruyn Kops (1933), S.M. Van Der Zee (1939), K.H. Dronkers (1946), and G.Van Der Pol (1949).

The history of the first duty and excise tax collections in Indonesia began in the Dutch colonial era in 1886 against kerosene based on the Ordonnantie van December 27, 1886, Stbl. 1886 Number 249. issued by the government of the Dutch East Indies.

During the colonialization period of Japan, the Japanese Occupation Army passed Law no. 13 on the opening of government offices in Java and Madura. In article 1, paragraph 2 of the law states: "Customs and excise duty offices in regions and branches shall not be taken care of temporarily". The department's functions of collecting import duty and export duty were eliminated, leaving only the function of collecting excise. The Customs and Excise, Tax Branch was made into an institution with the joint name  led by Chogo assisted by several native employees, namely  Soetikno Slamet and H.A. Pandelaki. Shortly after Indonesia proclaimed independence, the organization of the Ministry of Finance was formed and the Customs and Excise was established to be part of the Tax Office.

On 1 October 1946, Sjafruddin Prawiranegara, minister of finance at the time, decide to overhaul organizational structure of the Ministry of Finance. Customs and Excise is released from the Tax Office and becomes standalone office as the Customs and Excise Office and appoints Mr. R.A. Kartadjoemena as Chief of Customs and Excise Officer. That date is considered as the date of birth of the Directorate General of Customs and Excise.

Task and Functions

Main Task
To carry out the main task of Ministry of Finance in the field of customs and excise, based on the policy determined by Minister, and secure government policy related with the traffic of goods entering and leaving Customs Territory and Customs and Excise levies as well as other state levies based on the prevailing government regulations and laws.

Purpose

To carry out the main task, Directorate General of Customs and Excise has the function of:
Formulating the technical policy in the field of customs and excise, in accordance with the policy determined by Minister and the prevailing government regulations and laws.
Planning, implementing, controlling, evaluating, and securing technical operation of government policy which related with the control of traffic of goods entering and leaving customs territory, in accordance with the policy determined by Minister and based on the prevailing government regulations and laws.
Planning, implementing, controlling, evaluating and securing technical operation in the field of import duty and excise levy also other levies which are under the responsibility of Directorate General based on the prevailing government regulations and laws.
Planning, developing and counseling in services, permits, facilities, procedures and supervision in the field of customs and excise based on the prevailing government regulations and laws.
Prevention on breach of government regulations and laws of customs and excise and enforcement in the field of customs and excise and also investigation of criminal act of customs and excise in accordance with the prevailing government regulations and laws.

Other functions
Since DJBC is the agency that regulates the entry of goods in the territory of Indonesia, DJBC's duty is also to enforce export and import regulations issued by other ministries or government agencies, such as:

 Ministry of Trade
 Fish Quarantine and Inspection Agency
 Animal Quarantine of Indonesian Agricultural Quarantine Agency (IAQA)
 Plant Quarantine of Indonesian Agricultural Quarantine Agency (IAQA)
 National Agency of Drug and Food Control
 Ministry of Health
 Nuclear Energy Regulatory Agency
 Bank Indonesia
 Ministry of Environment and Forestry
 Directorate General of Resource and Equipment Post and Informatics
 Ministry of Agriculture
 Ministry of Industry
 Indonesian National Police
 Ministry of Energy and Mineral Resources
 Directorate General of Taxes

Organisation 

The organisation structure of Directorate General of Customs and Excise comprises the following components: 
 Directorate General of Customs and Excise, position held by Director General
 Secretariat General of Customs and Excise
 Department of Organization and Governance
 Department of Finance
 Department of Personnel Administration
 Department of Government-owned Goods
 Department of Personnel Development
 Department of General Affairs
 Directorate of Customs Affairs
 Sub-directorate of Import
 Sub-directorate of Export
 Sub-directorate of Goods Classification
 Sub-directorate of Customs valuation
 Sub-directorate of Registration
 Sub-directorate of Priority Program and Authorized Economic Operator
 Directorate of Customs Facility
 Sub-directorate of Tariff Exemption
 Sub-directorate of Mining Affairs
 Sub-directorate of Importation for Export Purpose
 Sub-directorate of Free Trade Zone
 Sub-directorate of Special Zone
 Directorate of Excise Affairs and Facility
 Sub-directorate of Excise Tariff
 Sub-directorate of Excise Permit and Facility
 Sub-directorate of Excise Payment and Refund
 Sub-directorate of Free Trade Zone
 Sub-directorate of Excise Potency and Compliance of Excise-able Entrepreneurs
 Directorate of International and Public Affairs
 Sub-directorate of Multilateral
 Sub-directorate of Bilateral
 Sub-directorate of Regional
 Sub-directorate of Communication and Publication
 Sub-directorate of Counseling and Information Services
 Directorate of Appeals Objection and Regulatory
 Sub-directorate of Objection
 Sub-directorate of Appeals 
 Sub-directorate of Legal Efforts
 Sub-directorate of Regulatory
 Directorate of Customs and Excise Information
 Sub-directorate of Planning and Strategy Information System
 Sub-directorate of Information System Development
 Sub-directorate of Legal Efforts
 Sub-directorate of Regulatory
 Directorate of Internal Compliance
 Sub-directorate of Prevention
 Sub-directorate of Compliance Supervision and Internal Investigation
 Sub-directorate of Quality Assurance
 Sub-directorate of Performance Management
 Directorate of Customs and Excise Audit
 Sub-directorate of Audit Planning
 Sub-directorate of Audit Execution I 
 Sub-directorate of Audit Execution II
 Sub-directorate of Monitoring, Evaluation, and Audit Quality Assurance
 Directorate of Prosecution and Investigation
 Sub-directorate of Intelligence
 Sub-directorate of Prosecution 
 Sub-directorate of Marine Patrol
 Sub-directorate of Narcotics
 Sub-directorate of Investigation
 Sub-directorate of Operational Equipment
 Directorate of Revenue and Strategic Planning
 Sub-directorate of Revenue
 Sub-directorate of Strategic Planning and Transformation Management
 Sub-directorate of Risk Management
 Primary Service Office (Kantor Pelayanan Utama)
 Kantor Pelayanan Utama Bea dan Cukai Tipe A Tanjung Priok
 Kantor Pelayanan Utama Bea dan Cukai Tipe B Batam
 Kantor Pelayanan Utama Bea dan Cukai Tipe C Soekarno-Hatta
 Customs and Excise Regional Office (Kantor Wilayah DJBC)
 Kantor Wilayah DJBC Aceh di Banda Aceh
 Kantor Wilayah DJBC Sumatera Utara di Medan
 Kantor Wilayah DJBC Riau di Pekanbaru
 Kantor Wilayah DJBC Khusus Kepulauan Riau di Tanjung Balai Karimun
 Kantor Wilayah DJBC Sumatera Bagian Timur di Palembang
 Kantor Wilayah DJBC Sumatera Bagian Barat di Bandar Lampung
 Kantor Wilayah DJBC Banten di Tangerang
 Kantor Wilayah DJBC Jakarta di Jakarta Pusat
 Kantor Wilayah DJBC Jawa Barat di Bandung
 Kantor Wilayah DJBC Jawa Tengah Dan D.I. Yogyakarta di Semarang
 Kantor Wilayah DJBC Jawa Timur I di Surabaya
 Kantor Wilayah DJBC Jawa Timur II di Malang
 Kantor Wilayah DJBC Bali, NTB Dan NTT di Denpasar
 Kantor Wilayah DJBC Kalimantan Bagian Barat di Pontianak
 Kantor Wilayah DJBC Kalimantan Bagian Timur di Balikpapan
 Kantor Wilayah DJBC Sulawesi di Makassar
 Kantor Wilayah DJBC Maluku, Papua Dan Papua Barat di Ambon

Logo of Directorate General of Customs and Excise

Design
A pentagon with the image of sea, mountain, and sky inside it;
A staff with a spiral of 8 at the under-part;
Wings consisting of 30 small wings and 10 big wings;
Rice tassel in amount of 24 forming a circle.

Meaning
Pentagon represents Pancasila as the foundation of the Republic of Indonesia ;
Sea, mountain and sky represent the jurisdiction of the Customs Law and Excise Law.
Staff represents international trade of the Republic of Indonesia from/to 8 directions of wind
Wings represent the Finance Day of the Republic of Indonesia on 30 October and represent the Directorate General of Customs and Excise as part of the Ministry of Finance in Customs and Excise sector.
Rice tassel circle represents the purpose of Directorate General of Customs and Excise that is the prosperity and welfare of Indonesia.

Equipment

The customs officers are trained in the use of firearms. Customs Tactical Unit (CTU) officers are also trained in the use of rifles.

 Pindad P3A – Standard issue sidearm. 
 Pindad SBC-1 – Standard issue rifle.

Customs Clearance

Customs Clearance Process
 Exporter and Importer is required to provide Customs declaration to the Customs, the documents is pemberitahuan ekspor barang (PEB) for exporter and pemberitahuan impor barang (PIB) for importer.
 Documents for Customs declaration includes: invoice, packing list, document issued by carrier (Air waybill or Bill of lading), Certificate of origin if available, and import/export permit if required.
 Customs duties in Indonesia is based on self assessment. Exporter/importer themselves will then submit customs declaration and paid the customs based on their own assessment.
 Directorate General of Customs and Excise (DJBC) officer will then check customs declaration and the customs duties. If customs declaration is complied with regulation, they will issue customs release letter (surat pemberitahuan pengeluaran barang /SPPB) to the exporter/importer, if not then customs declaration will be rejected and exporter/importer may revise and re-submit customs declaration .
 Exported/Imported goods cannot leave customs area before receiving customs release letter (SPPB)
 All above processes are using online system to minimize interaction between exporter/importer and DJBC officer.

Channeling
DJBC is also implement automated channel system based on importer/exporter profile, commodity type of goods, track record and information contained in the DJBC intelligence. There are 4 channel:
 Special priority channel, also named Main Customs Partner (Mitra Utama /MITA), for exporter/importer with excellent track record, for importers of this type of goods expenditure is done automatically (automation system) which is a priority in terms of service, in terms of supervision then exporter/importer of this type will be subject to Post Clearance Audit system (PCA) and occasionally randomly by a computer system will be set for physical inspection. Exporters/Importers are required to apply for this channel and approved by DJBC to be able to use this channel.
 Green channel, this channel is intended for exporter/importer with a good track record and the export/import commodities are low risk. Physical inspection of goods may be carried out if selected as random sampling by the system or customs intelligence indicates requirement for further inspection of the goods.
 Yellow channel, this channel is for exporter/importer with a good track record and export/import commodities are medium risk. Physical inspection of goods may be carried out if selected as random sampling by the system or customs intelligence indicates requirement for further inspection of the goods.
 Red channel, is a channel imposed to new exporter/importer, existing exporter/importer with certain records, high risk exporter/importer because of poor track records, certain types of commodities, or customs brokerage with poor track record. This channel will undergo intensive supervision and physical inspection of goods.

References

External links
  World Customs Organization
  Official website
  Kantor Wilayah DJBC Khusus Kepulauan Riau
  Kantor Wilayah DJBC Kalimantan Bagian Timur
  Kantor Pelayanan Utama Bea Dan Cukai Tipe A Tanjung Priok
  Kantor Pelayanan Utama Bea dan Cukai Tipe B Batam
  Kantor Pengawasan dan Pelayanan Bea dan Cukai TMP B Makassar
  Kantor Pengawasan dan Pelayanan Bea dan Cukai TMC Kediri
  Kantor Pengawasan dan Pelayanan Tipe Madya Cukai Kudus
  Kantor Pengawasan dan Pelayanan Tipe Madya Pabean Dumai
  Kantor Pengawasan dan Pelayanan Bea dan Cukai Tipe Madya Pabean A Tangerang

Indonesia
Specialist law enforcement agencies of Indonesia